The Emblem of the Association of Southeast Asian Nations is the emblem of ASEAN adopted in July 1997 together with the  ASEAN flag. Although the current emblem was already in use for years, the official guidelines were adopted at the 6th Meeting of the ASEAN Coordinating Council (ACC) in Hanoi, 8 April 2010.

Design

Construction 
Set upon a red circle background, ten yellow paddy or rice stalks are drawn in the middle. Under the rice stalks the organisation name abbreviation "asean" is written in lower case bold Helvetica font in blue. The red circle is drawn with a white and blue circumference.

The colours of the emblem are specified as follows:

Symbolism 
 The ASEAN Emblem represents a stable, peaceful, united and dynamic ASEAN. The colours of the Emblem — blue, red, white and yellow — represent the main colours of the state crests of all the ASEAN Member States.
 Blue represents peace and stability, red depicts courage and dynamism, white shows purity and yellow symbolises prosperity.
 The ten bound stalks of rice in the centre of the Emblem represent the member states of ASEAN. They represent the dream of ASEAN's Founding Fathers for an ASEAN comprising all the countries in Southeast Asia, bound together in friendship and solidarity.
 The circle represents the unity of ASEAN.

History 
The design was based on rice, the staple food and probably the most important crop for the Southeast Asian people. Since ancient times, rice has been associated with prosperity, welfare, and wealth. This corresponds to the vision of the founding fathers of ASEAN to create a peaceful and prosperous region in Southeast Asia. The current design is derived from the previous emblem, also featuring a bundle of padi rice stalks bound together in unity. There were previously six rice stalks to represent the five founding nations of ASEAN (Indonesia, Malaysia, Philippines, Singapore, and Thailand), plus Brunei (joined on 8 January 1984). The old emblem background was white. The name "asean" was placed under the rice stalks in the centre of a yellow circle with a cyan circumference. Both the circle border and "asean" letters were in cyan, while the rice stalks were in golden brown.

After the expansion of ASEAN members with the admission of Vietnam on 28 July 1995, motivated by the vision of ASEAN comprising all ten Southeast Asian nations, there was a suggestion to update the emblem and flag of ASEAN with the addition of four more rice stalks to represent the whole ten ASEAN nations. The three remaining nations, Laos, Burma, and Cambodia, were scheduled to join ASEAN in July 1997. To commemorate this auspicious event, the new emblem of ASEAN was unveiled. Laos and Burma (Myanmar) joined on 23 July 1997, however, the admission of Cambodia was postponed to 30 April 1999 due to their internal political problems. Despite the Cambodian postponed membership, the ASEAN new emblem still consisted of ten rice stalks and was unveiled in July 1997.

See also 
 Flag of the Association of Southeast Asian Nations

References 
 Guidelines on the Use of the ASEAN Emblem

Notes

External links 
 Logos of ASEAN

Emblem
Symbols introduced in 1997